Diva is a 2020 Korean thriller film directed by Cho Seul-ye, starring Shin Min-a and Lee Yoo-young. The film marks the directorial debut of Cho Seul-ye and revolves around a competitive diver (Shin Min-a) and her best friend and rival (Lee Yoo-young), who goes missing after the two are involved in a car accident. It was released in Korea on September 23, 2020.

The title of the film was suggested by director Park Chan-wook, who reviewed an early draft of the screenplay. Cho found that the word translated to "goddess" in Italian, but to "demon" in Arabic; she appreciated the dual meaning, and so adopted it as the title of her film.

The film received two nominations in the 41st Blue Dragon Film Awards: for Best Leading Actress (Shin); and for Best Cinematography and Lighting.

Synopsis
Yi-young (Shin Min-a) has all the talent to be a ‘Diving Diva’. She misses her best friend Soo-jin (Lee Yoo-young), so she changes her event to synchronizing swimming. While into olympics selection practice, they are involved in a freak accident, Soo-jin disappears and Yi-young loses her memory. As she gets her memory back, she remembers strange side of Soo-jin. She begins to lose her control on the diving board.

Cast
 Shin Min-a as Yi-young
 Kwak Ji-hye as young Yi-young
 Lee Yoo-young as Soo-jin
 Choe Dain as young Soo-jin
 Lee Kyu-hyung as Diving coach
 Joo Suk-tae as CEO Lee
 Oh Ha-nee as Kang Cho-ah, super child
 Park Sung-yeon as Detective Oh
 Yoongeum Sun-ah as Hwang Hyeon-shin
 Park Choong-seon as president
 Heo Hyeong-gyu as detective Kang 
 Bae So-young as nurse
 Oh Hee-joon as Reporter at Hospital
 Ji Yi-soo as Lee Yeong's agency representative

Production
Filming began on July 16, 2018 and was wrapped up on November 5, 2018.

Release
The film was released theatrically on September 23, 2020 in South Korea.

Diva was invited at 25th Bucheon International Fantastic Film Festival held in July 2021. It was showcased in Korean Fantastic features section.

Awards and nominations

References

External links
 
 
 
 

2020s Korean-language films
South Korean sports films
2020 directorial debut films
2020 films
2020 thriller films